Cubarral is a town and municipality in the Meta Department, Colombia. The municipality of Guamal borders Cubarral to the north, to the west is bordered by the department of Cundinamarca, to the east by the municipality of San Martín and to the south by the municipality of El Dorado. Furthermore, According to DANE projections from the 2005 census, Cubarral would have a population of approximately 5946 people by 2015.

Hydrography 
There are a lot of rivers that cross the municipality of Cubarral, and according to National Environmental Licensing Authority (ANLA) in Spanish, some of the main watercourses are:

 Ariari river
 Humadea river
 Tonoa river

Climate
Cubarral has a tropical rainforest climate (Köppen Af) with heavy to very heavy rainfall year-round.

References

Municipalities of Meta Department